Richard James Mansfield (born 21 January 1975) is a former Indian born English cricketer.  Mansfield was a right-handed batsman who bowled right-arm off break.  He was born in Madras, Tamil Nadu.

Mansfield represented the Surrey Cricket Board in 3 List A matches, the first of which came against Lincolnshire in the 2nd round of the 2002 Cheltenham & Gloucester Trophy which was played in 2001.  His final 2 List A matches came against the Gloucestershire Cricket Board and the Essex Cricket Board in the 1st and 2nd rounds of the 2003 Cheltenham & Gloucester Trophy which were held in 2002.  In his 3 List A matches, he scored 46 runs at a batting average of 15.33, with a high score of 40.

References

External links
Richard Mansfield at Cricinfo

1975 births
Living people
Cricketers from Chennai
Tamil Nadu cricketers
English cricketers
Surrey Cricket Board cricketers
English cricketers of the 21st century